The Hurstbridge railway line is a commuter rail passenger train service in Melbourne, Australia. It shares tracks with the Mernda railway line until Clifton Hill, then heads in a north-east direction through the cities of Yarra, Darebin and Banyule, and the Shire of Nillumbik. It serves between Flinders Street in the Melbourne central business district through the northern suburbs up to Hurstbridge. The service is part of the Public Transport Victoria metropolitan rail network.

History

19th century 

The first section of the Hurstbridge line to open was between Victoria Park (then named Collingwood) and Heidelberg, in May 1888, although there is some evidence that the contractors building the line operated services prior to that.
At this time, the line was connected to other lines via a line from Royal Park to Clifton Hill, most of which comprised what was later known as the Inner Circle line. This connection was opened at the same time.

20th century 

A more direct connection, between Princes Bridge and Victoria Park (as Collingwood was renamed at the same time) was opened in October 1901. In June the following year the line was extended to Eltham, and ten years later (June 1912) to Hurst's Bridge (now Hurstbridge). In 1912 the short Mont Park branch was built branching from Macleod station to serve the Mont Park Asylum.

In the same year as the line reached Hurstbridge, the line between Westgarth and Alphington was duplicated.

In April 1921, automatic signalling was implemented between Princes Bridge and Clifton Hill.

A few months later, the line (from Princes Bridge) was electrified to Heidelberg, followed by electrification to Eltham in April 1923 and Hurstbridge in August 1926.

In September 1926, the then single-track section between Clifton Hill and Westgarth was converted to Lever Locking and Track Control signalling, followed by Alphington to Heidelberg in June 1927.

In June 1949, the line between Ivanhoe and Heidelberg was duplicated and provided with automatic signalling. The same was done to the Alphington to Ivanhoe section in December 1951.

Duplication continued between Heidelberg and Macleod in December 1958, except for a short section after Heidelberg where the line crosses a bridge then goes through a tunnel. That section remained single until 2018 when it was duplicated as part of the Level Crossing Removal at Lower Plenty Road.

On two consecutive days in September 1964, automatic signalling was provided between Westgarth and Fairfield, and Fairfield and Alphington.

Macleod to Greensborough was duplicated and converted to automatic signalling in August 1979. The duplication also included a number of level crossing removals and a rebuilt Watsonia station.

Macleod station is the only station on the Hurstbridge line with more than two platforms. A third platform was provided in the 1970s, and is used during peak periods to provide a place at which trains can originate or terminate.

Weekend services commenced through running to Hurstbridge in April 1985. Previously, weekend services between Eltham and Hurstbridge operated as a shuttle service, with passengers required to change trains at Eltham. Prior to the timetable change, the shuttle service was provided by a double ended motored Tait train, and after their withdrawal in 1984, the shuttle service was provided by a 3 car Hitachi or Comeng.

21st century 

Since 2017, the Comeng trains on the Hurstbridge line have been progressively replaced by X'Trapolis 100 units.

The short section between Clifton Hill and Westgarth, crossing the moderately-deep valley of the Merri Creek, was duplicated in January 2009. The rarely used centre running line at Clifton Hill was also removed at this time.

As a part of the upgrades undertaken by operator Metro Trains Melbourne, the superstructure of the Burgundy Street bridge near Heidelberg station was replaced in June 2010, costing over $1,000,000.

Several stations on the Hurstbridge line formerly had goods yards or sidings. Those at Fairfield, Alphington, Ivanhoe, Heidelberg and Greensborough have been removed completely (although a single track remained at Heidelberg for many years for stabling defective trains). The former goods yards at Eltham and Hurstbridge are now used as stabling sidings, following modifications to the track layout. The siding at Diamond Creek was originally used for goods purposes (according to the 1926 Curves and Grades book) and was retained for use as a crossing loop. A platform was not built on the loop until 1994, requiring trains to "set back" after using the platform in order to cross.

The name of Wattleglen station is curious, because the town is named Wattle Glen. Platform signs also read "Wattle Glen," but the station appears as Wattleglen on some official railway documents, and is gazetted as such on the State Government VicNames register.

Future

Level Crossing Removals

Hurstbridge Line Duplication 

In May 2016, Victorian State Government allocated the funding for duplication of  section between Heidelberg and Rosanna stations. Upgrade includes construction of second railway bridge over Burgundy Street in Heidelberg, second tunnel for Flinders Street-bound track under Darebin Street, next to the existing Hurstbridge-bound single-track tunnel and a new elevated Rosanna station. In conjunction with section duplication, two level crossings - at Grange Road in Alphington and Lower Plenty Road, next to Rosanna station, were separated as part of Level Crossing Removal Project.

Early works on the duplication began in June 2016, with major construction started in March 2017. The duplication of the single-track section was completed in May 2018. 35 new and extended weekly train services between Eltham and the city loop took into effect on 26 August 2018.

In May 2019, second stage of track duplication on line was announced. That includes adding second track between Greensborough and Eltham, and between Diamond Creek and Wattle Glen. Greensborough and Montmorency stations will be rebuilt. Eltham Trestle Bridge will be retained, due to its heritage status. Major works started in late 2020. A two week closure saw the raising of a new Plenty River rail bridge as well as other works, with the duplication now expected to be complete by mid-2023.

Network and operations

Services 

On weekdays during the morning peak, citybound services originate at one of Hurstbridge, Eltham, Greensborough, or Macleod stations, with most services originating from the former two stations running express from Clifton Hill to Jolimont. Four services from Hurstbridge run express from Heidelberg to Jolimont, stopping only at Ivanhoe and Clifton Hill. Outbound services also terminate at one of the above four plus Heidelberg stations. Two services terminate at Heidelberg, both run express from Clifton Hill to Heidelberg, stopping at Ivanhoe. Most Eltham services stops all stations except for the 7:00am Eltham which runs express between Clifton Hill and Heidelberg only stopping at Ivanhoe. A few Hurstbridge services runs express from Jolimont to Clifton Hill. All other services stops all stations.

On weekday afternoon peaks, citybound services originate at Hurstbridge, Eltham, Greensborough and Macleod. All services from Greensborough and Macleod and almost all services from Hurstbridge stop at all stations. The 4:03pm up Hurstbridge runs express between Clifton Hill and Jolimont and the 5:01pm up Hurstbridge runs express from Heidelberg to Jolimont stopping only at Ivanhoe and Clifton Hill. Two services from Eltham also run to the same pattern as the 5:01pm Flinders Street. Outbound services on the Hurstbridge line terminate at the following stations; Macleod, Greensborough, Eltham and Hurstbridge. The Macleod, Greensborough and Eltham services stop all stations, except for the 4:04pm Eltham which runs express between Clifton Hill and Heidelberg stopping only at Ivanhoe and Hurstbridge services run express from Jolimont to Heidelberg stopping at Clifton Hill and Ivanhoe in-between.

All other weekday services and all weekend services stop at all stations, with every second service usually originating and terminating at Eltham. All services run clockwise through the City Loop, except weekend early morning services which runs direct to and from Flinders Street and originating and terminating at Hurstbridge.

Stopping patterns

Operators

Route 

Due to constraints imposed by geography and lack of government investment, Hurstbridge line is both notable and notorious for having several parts of single rail track along the  section between Greensborough and Hurstbridge. Both Eltham and Diamond Creek stations have two platforms, which provide places at which trains can pass. This section of unduplicated track includes a timber trestle bridge near Eltham station that has heritage protection. The bridge has a  speed limit. These single-track sections create bottlenecks at which trains must often wait for up to 10 minutes for an oncoming train before proceeding.

Most of this section had earthworks done during the 1970s to allow for a second track, including abutments for bridges. The only places where space for track duplication has not been provided are a cutting on the down side of Montmorency station (though the section under the road bridge crossing the cutting has been widened), the wooden trestle near Eltham station, and a short cutting on the down side of Wattle Glen station.

The Hurstbridge line traverses the rolling landscape of Melbourne's north-eastern suburbs, at times cutting across hills and valleys, resulting in a somewhat winding and undulating track. It includes the only three tunnels on the suburban electrified system, other than the Melbourne City Loop, although none of them are particularly long or deep.

The section from Flinders Street station to Victoria Park was built later than the rest of the line, which was originally connected to the suburban system via the now-closed Inner Circle railway line. There is evidence that the line was originally intended to be connected via this route, but geography and existing suburban development made it a problematic situation. The section to Victoria Park runs through two tunnels under a low ridge just east of the city, but most of the rest runs on an embankment that carries the line above numerous main roads and suburban side streets.

After Clifton Hill the line roughly parallels the north bank of the Yarra River, cutting across a number of watercourses flowing into the river, and the ridges between them. There is a third tunnel just past Heidelberg station.

The inner section of the line traverses heavily built-up suburbs, but the suburbia is less dense between Clifton Hill and Greensborough. The outer end of the line is surrounded by paddocks and patches of bush.

The line features four of the largest bridges on the suburban network: twin bridges over the Merri Creek, between Clifton Hill and Westgarth station, another on the up side of Darebin station, crossing Darebin Creek, and a wooden trestle bridge across the Diamond Creek just on the up side of Eltham. At  in length, this bridge is allegedly the longest curved wooden trestle bridge in use on a revenue railway in the southern hemisphere, and is the only wooden bridge still in use on a revenue railway in Melbourne.

Apart from the first section of the line, there are numerous level crossings, plus a number of private driveway crossings between Diamond Creek and Hurstbridge (and two little-used public roads) that have only passive protection (no operating lights or bells). The line also crosses a number of roads using bridges.

Stations 
The line serves 28 stations across  of track. The stations are a mix of elevated, lowered, underground, and ground level designs. Underground stations are present only in the City Loop, with the majority of elevated and lowered stations being constructed as part of level crossing removals.

Infrastructure

Rolling stock 
The Hurstbridge line uses X'Trapolis 100 electric multiple unit (EMU) trains operating in a two three-car configuration, with three doors per side on each carriage and can accommodate of up to 432 seated passengers in each six car configuration. The trains were originally built between 2002 and 2004 as well as between 2009 and 2020 with a total of 212 three-car sets constructed. The trains are shared with 7 other metropolitan train lines and have been in service since 2003.

Alongside the passenger trains, Hurstbridge line tracks and equipment are maintained by a fleet of engineering trains. The four types of engineering trains are: the shunting train; designed for moving trains along non-electrified corridors and for transporting other maintenance locomotives, for track evaluation; designed for evaluating track and its condition, the overhead inspection train; designed for overhead wiring inspection, and the infrastructure evaluation carriage designed for general infrastructure evaluation. Most of these trains are repurposed locomotives previously used by V/Line, Metro Trains, and the Southern Shorthaul Railroad.

Accessibility 
In compliance with the Disability Discrimination Act of 1992, all stations that are new-built or rebuilt are fully accessible and comply with these guidelines. Just over half of the stations on the corridor are fully accessible, however, there are some stations that haven't been upgraded to meet these guidelines. These stations do feature ramps, however, they have a gradient greater than 1 in 14. Stations that are fully accessible feature ramps that have a gradient less than 1 in 14, have at-grade paths, or feature lifts. These stations typically also feature tactile boarding indicators, independent boarding ramps, wheelchair accessible myki barriers, hearing loops, and widened paths.

Projects improving station accessibility have included the Level Crossing Removal Project, which involves station rebuilds and upgrades, and individual station upgrade projects. These works have made significant strides in improving network accessibility, with more than 61% of Lilydale line stations classed as fully accessible. Future station upgrade projects will continue to increase the number of fully accessible stations overtime.

Signalling 

Until early 2013, the Hurstbridge line was the last electrified railway in Melbourne to use a token system of safeworking. The Greensborough to Eltham section was controlled by the miniature electric staff system, and Eltham to Hurstbridge section by the staff and ticket system. If required, the latter section could be divided into two at Diamond Creek, to allow trains to cross at that station. In conjunction with these systems, trains through Greensborough, Eltham and Hurstbridge stations continued to be controlled by some semaphore signals.

In the first few months of 2013, the staff systems and semaphore signals were replaced by electronic three-position coloured light signalling, controlled remotely from Epping. The Greensborough-Diamond Creek section was converted on 3 February 2013, and the Diamond Creek-Hurstbridge section was converted on 22 March 2013.

References

External links
 Hurstbridge line timetable
 Network map
 

Railway lines in Melbourne
Railway lines opened in 1888
Heidelberg, Victoria
1888 establishments in Australia
Public transport routes in the City of Melbourne (LGA)
Transport in the City of Yarra
Transport in the City of Banyule
Transport in the City of Darebin
Transport in the Shire of Nillumbik
1500 V DC railway electrification